Demodex folliculorum is a microscopic mite that can only survive on the skin of humans. Most people have D.folliculorum on their skin. Usually, the mites do not cause any harm, so are considered an example of commensalism rather than parasitism. D.folliculorum-caused disease, though, is known as demodicosis.

Anatomy
Due to being adapted to live inside hair follicles, D. folliculorum is thin and worm-like, with short legs. Adults have four pairs of legs; larvae and nymphs have only three pairs. D.folliculorum has a rudimentary gut and anus.

Reproduction and life cycle
The entire life cycle of D.folliculorum takes 14–16 days. Adult mites copulate at the top of the hair follicle, near the skin surface. Eggs are deposited in the sebaceous gland inside the hair follicle. Seven days are needed for the larva to develop into a mature adult, with two intervening nymph stages. The adult lives for 4–6 days.

Ecology
D. folliculorum prefers areas where sebum production is high, and is typically found in hair follicles on the human face, generally in greater numbers around the cheeks, nose, and forehead, but also elsewhere on the face, eyelids, and ears. The mites may also be found on other parts of the body, such as the chest and buttocks.

Within the hair follicle, D. folliculorum is found above the sebaceous gland, positioned head downward, with the end of abdomen often protruding from the hair follicle. Inhabited follicles usually contain 2–6 mites, but greater numbers can occur.

In one hour, D. folliculorum can travel  ; the mites usually travel at night.

The mites are obligate commensals of humans, and can only live on the skin; they soon dry out and die if they leave the host. Higher numbers of D.folliculorum are found in the spring and summer than at other times of the year.

Relationship with humans
D. folliculorum is not found on newborn babies, but is acquired shortly after birth, most likely due to maternal contact. Few mites are found on children under 10 years of age, but nearly all elderly people have them. The increasing population over time may be due to a small initial presence gradually growing over time, or may be because levels of the mite's food, sebum, increase with age.

High numbers of D. folliculorum are associated with blepharitis and acne rosacea. The exact mechanism by which the mites cause disease is unknown; they may physically block the hair follicle, carry disease-causing bacteria, or after death, their bodies may cause either a delayed hypersensitivity response, or an innate immune response. Controversy exists over whether high numbers of D. folliculorum cause rosacea, or whether the skin environment caused by rosacea is more hospitable to mites than normal skin, allowing them to flourish. Populations of D. folliculorum are also increased in people with immunosuppression.

History
The first report of Demodex folliculorum was made by German scientist Jakob Henle in 1841, but his presentation to the Natural Sciences Society of Zurich, reported in a local newspaper, attracted little attention at the time. In 1842, German dermatologist Gustav Simon gave a full report of the appearance of D. folliculorum, naming it Acarus folliculorum. The following year, 1843, the genus was named Demodex by English scientist Richard Owen. From Simon's initial description of D.folliculorum onwards, two forms were recognized, a long form and a short form. In 1963, it was suggested that these long and short forms were two subspecies of D.folliculorum, and that the smaller mite be named Demodex brevis, with the larger mite retaining the name D. folliculorum. It was not until 1972 that the existence of two separate species was confirmed.

See also
 Human microbiome

References

External links
 

Trombidiformes
Animals described in 1842
Parasitic_arthropods_of_humans